Grapholita gemmiferana is a species of moth of the  family Tortricidae.

Distribution
This species is present in most of Europe and in the Near East.

Description
These moths are characterized by a basically slate-colored forewings, with an orange-ochreous color in the distal area, also showing various silvery lines and spots. Females are usually darker. This species is rather similar to Grapholita caecana.

Biology
Adult moths fly from April to July, caterpillars can be found from June to September. Larvae feed within spun leaves  of the narrow-leaved everlasting-pea (Lathyrus sylvestris) and on the pods of Lathyrus pannonicus. They overwinter in a cocoon from August- September and pupate in April.

References

External links
 
 
 Pathpiva
 Lepi-photos

Grapholitini